RMAF Gong Kedak  is an air force base operated by the Royal Malaysian Air Force. It is located in Gong Kedak, Pasir Puteh District, Kelantan, Malaysia.

History

The RMAF Gong Kedak existed before World War II where in the early 1960s, this airbase was used by the Royal Air Force for training and then in the 1970s until 1989, the airbase was used by the Malaysian Armed Forces as a training area especially for parachute training. To strengthen national defense, especially the RMAF, the government has decided to develop RMAF Gong Kedak and for this purpose, the government started the land acquisition process for the construction of RMAF Gong Kedak in 1981. Now it is known as "The Home of the Flankers", as the Sukhoi Su-30MKM of 12 Squadron is based there. ATSC Sukhoi Technical Centre also located here to provide maintenance for Sukhoi Su-30MKM.

Squadron assigned

Main Squadron

See also

 Royal Malaysian Air Force bases
 List of airports in Malaysia

References

Airports in Kelantan
Pasir Puteh District